The 2005–06 season was the 60th season in FK Partizan's existence. This article shows player statistics and all matches (official and friendly) that the club played during the 2005–06 season.

Players

Squad information

Squad statistics

Transfers

In

Out

Loan in

Loan out

Competitions

Overview

Serbia and Montenegro SuperLiga

League table

Serbia and Montenegro Cup

UEFA Champions League

Second qualifying round

Third qualifying round

UEFA Cup

First round

See also
 List of FK Partizan seasons

References

External links
 Official website
 Partizanopedia 2005-2006  (in Serbian)

FK Partizan seasons
Partizan